Eduardo Assam (19 July 1919 – 21 January 1997) was a Mexican wrestler. He competed at the 1948 Summer Olympics and the 1952 Summer Olympics.

References

1919 births
1997 deaths
Mexican male sport wrestlers
Olympic wrestlers of Mexico
Wrestlers at the 1948 Summer Olympics
Wrestlers at the 1952 Summer Olympics
Place of birth missing
Wrestlers at the 1951 Pan American Games
Pan American Games bronze medalists for Mexico
Pan American Games medalists in wrestling
Medalists at the 1951 Pan American Games
20th-century Mexican people
21st-century Mexican people